Planned Invasion may refer to:

 Planned French invasion of Britain (1759), an abandoned invasion of Britain in 1759
 Napoleon's invasion of the United Kingdom, a French plan to invade Britain in 1803–04
 Operation Sea Lion, a German plan to invade Britain in 1940
 Operation Tannenbaum, a German plan to invade Switzerland in 1940
 Proposed Japanese invasion of Australia during World War II, a Japanese plan to invade Australia in 1942
 Operation Herkules, an Axis plan to invade Malta in 1942
 Operation Downfall, an Allied plan to invade Japan in 1945–46